Ashwin Jerome is an up-and-coming actor who works in Tamil-language films. He is known for playing the lead role in Yaanum Theeyavan (2017).

Career 
Ashwin was a professional dancer and he used to run a dance school before studying engineering and working in an information technology company for sometime. He had also completed a master's degree in business administration and worked in a resort in Singapore. His interest in cinema led him to join the theater group Koothu-P-Pattarai. He made his acting debut in Yaanum Theeyavan (2017), which starred Varsha Bollamma and Raju Sundaram. In a review of the film, a critic from the Deccan Chronicle noted that "Debutant Ashwin Jerome has the right looks of a hero and he is good at action sequences as well". He played the second lead in the thriller Pancharaaksharam, but the film ended up releasing after Natpe Thunai (2019). He was approached for the role by Hiphop Tamizha Aadhi and the film producers Khushbu and Sundar C.

Personal life 
His father, Jerome Pushparaj, is a music composer.
He tied the knot with Ms. Olivette Nivedha on November 11, 2021. They welcomed their first child Adele Natalia in 2022.

Filmography

References

External links 

Indian male film actors
Male actors in Tamil cinema
21st-century Indian male actors
Year of birth missing (living people)
Living people